BAG family molecular chaperone regulator 1 is a protein that in humans is encoded by the BAG1 gene.

Function 

The oncogene BCL2 is a membrane protein that blocks a step in a pathway leading to apoptosis or programmed cell death. The protein encoded by this gene binds to BCL2 and is referred to as BCL2-associated athanogene. It enhances the anti-apoptotic effects of BCL2 and represents a link between growth factor receptors and anti-apoptotic mechanisms. At least three protein isoforms are encoded by this mRNA through the use of alternative translation initiation sites, including a non-AUG site.

Clinical significance 

BAG gene has been implicated in age related neurodegenerative diseases as Alzheimer's.  It has been demonstrated that BAG1 and BAG 3 regulate the proteasomal and lysosomal protein elimination pathways, respectively.

Interactions 

BAG1 has been shown to interact with:

 Androgen receptor, 
 C-Raf, 
 Calcitriol receptor, 
 Glucocorticoid receptor, 
 HSPA8, 
 HBEGF, 
 PPP1R15A, 
 NR1B1,  and
 SIAH1.

References

External links

Further reading 

Ageing
Oncogenes
Aging-related genes
Aging-related proteins
Co-chaperones